Farkas is a Hungarian surname or a given name; the latter corresponds in the Catholic tradition to the German name Wolfgang.

List of persons with the surname
 Alexander S. Farkas, former executive of Alexander's, an American department store founded by his father
 Andrea Farkas, Hungarian handball goalkeeper
Andrew Farkas, American writer
 Andy Farkas, former American football player, who, along with 9 other players, holds the record for the longest pass caught in NFL history
 Balázs Farkas, Hungarian footballer
 Bertalan Farkas, the first Hungarian cosmonaut and the first Esperantist in space
 David Farkas, American actor, lead singer of Farkas
 Dénes Farkas de Boldogfa (1884–1973), landowner, politician, member of the Hungarian Parliament
 Evelyn Farkas, American intelligence analyst
 Ferenc Farkas de Boldogfa (1713–1770), jurist, landowner, vice-ispán of the county of Zala (alispán of Zala)
 Ferenc Farkas, Hungarian composer
 Ferenc Farkas de Kisbarnak (1892–1980), vitéz, Hungarian nobleman, World War II General and Chief Scout, General Captain (Hungarian: Főkapitány) of The Knightly Order of Vitéz
 Györgyi Farkas, birth name of Györgyi Zsivoczky-Farkas, Hungarian track and field athlete
 Gyula Farkas de Kisbarnabak (1894–1958), Hungarian nobleman and literature historian
 Gyula Farkas de Kisbarnabak (1847–1930), Hungarian nobleman, mathematician and physicist
 József Farkas de Boldogfa (1857–1951), Hungarian nobleman, landowner, politician, Member of the Hungarian Parliament
 Karl Farkas, Austrian actor
 Leonardo Farkas, Chilean businessman and philanthropist of Hungarian origin
 Mihály Farkas (1904–1965), Hungarian Jewish Communist politician
 Philip Farkas, American symphony horn player
 Sándor Farkas de Boldogfa (1880– 1946), vitéz, colonel of the Kingdom of Hungary, captain of the Order of Vitéz of the county of Zala. He was knight of the Order of the Iron Crown
 Tibor Farkas de Boldogfa de Boldogfa (1883–1940) jurist, Hungarian nobleman, landowner, politician, member of the Hungarian Parliament, Hussar Captain
 Wally Farkas, guitarist with Texan rock band Galactic Cowboys

List of persons with the given name 
 Farkas Bejc, Hungarian prelate in the 13th century
 Farkas Bethlen, Hungarian noble and chronicler in the Principality of Transylvania
 Farkas Bolyai, or Wolfgang Bolyai
 Farkas Gatal, Hungarian noble in the 12th century
 Farkas Molnár (1897–1945) Hungarian architect, painter, essayist, and graphic artist
 Farkas Kempelen, or Wolfgang von Kempelen

Fictional characters
 Gordon Farkas, used car salesman in the 1990 Australian film, The Big Steal played by Steve Bisley
 Farkas is one of the werewolf characters players encounter in The Elder Scrolls V: Skyrim along with his brother, Vilkas (wolf in Lithuanian)
 Scut Farkus (variation of Farkas), the bully in the 1983 film A Christmas Story
Farkas "Bulk" Bulkmeier, comic relief in Power Rangers

Hungarian masculine given names
Hungarian-language surnames